Proasellus is a genus of isopod crustaceans in the family Asellidae. Two of its species, P. parvulus and P. slovenicus, are Slovenian endemics which are listed as vulnerable species on the IUCN Red List.

It contains the following species:

Proasellus acutianus Argano & Henry
Proasellus adriaticus Argano & Pesce, 1979
Proasellus alavensis Henry & Magniez, 2003
Proasellus albigensis (Magniez, 1965)
Proasellus ambracicus Pesce & Argano, 1980
Proasellus amiterninus Argano & Pesce, 1979
Proasellus anophtalmus (Karaman, 1934)
Proasellus aquaecalidae (Racovitza, 1922)
Proasellus aragonensis Henry & Magniez, 1992
Proasellus arnautovici (Remy, 1932)
Proasellus arthrodilus (Braga, 1945)
Proasellus bagradicus Henry & Magniez, 1972
Proasellus barduanii Alouf, Henry & Magniez, 1982
Proasellus basnosanui (Codreanu, 1962)
Proasellus bellesi Henry & Magniez, 1982
Proasellus beroni Henry & Magniez, 1968
Proasellus beticus Henry & Magniez, 1992
Proasellus boui Henry & Magniez, 1969
Proasellus burgundus Henry & Magniez, 1969
Proasellus cantabricus Henry & Magniez, 1968
Proasellus cavaticus (Leydig, 1871)
Proasellus chappuisi Henry & Magniez, 1968
Proasellus chauvini Henry & Magniez, 1978
Proasellus claudei Henry & Magniez, 1996
Proasellus coiffaiti Henry & Magniez, 1972
Proasellus collignoni Magniez & Henry, 2001
Proasellus comasi Henry & Magniez, 1982
Proasellus coxalis (Dollfus, 1892)
Proasellus cretensis Pesce & Argano, 1980
Proasellus danubialis (Codreanu & Codreanu, 1962)
Proasellus delhezi Henry & Magniez, 1973
Proasellus deminutus (Sket, 1959)
Proasellus dianae Pesce & Argano, 1985
Proasellus ebrensis Henry & Magniez, 1992
Proasellus elegans (Codreanu, 1962)
Proasellus escolai Henry & Magniez, 1982
Proasellus espanoli Henry & Magniez, 1982
Proasellus exiguus Afonso, 1983
Proasellus ezzu Argano & Campanero, 2004
Proasellus faesulanus Messana & Caselli, 1995
Proasellus franciscoloi (Chappuis, 1955)
Proasellus gardinii (Arcangeli, 1942)
Proasellus gauthieri (Monod, 1924)
Proasellus gineti Boulanouar, Boutin & Henry, 1991
Proasellus gjorgjevici Karaman, 1933
Proasellus gourbaultae Henry & Magniez, 1981
Proasellus grafi Henry & Magniez, 2003
Proasellus granadensis Henry & Magniez, 2003
Proasellus guipuzcoensis Henry & Magniez, 2003
Proasellus henseni Magniez & Henry, 2001
Proasellus hercegovinensis (Karaman, 1933)
Proasellus hermallensis Arcangeli, 1938
Proasellus hurki Magneiz & Henry, 2001
Proasellus hypogeus (Racovitza, 1922)
Proasellus ibericus (Braga, 1946)
Proasellus infirmus (Birstein, 1936)
Proasellus intermedius (Sket, 1965)
Proasellus istrianus (Stammer, 1932)
Proasellus italicus Dudich, 1925
Proasellus jaloniacus Henry & Magniez, 1978
Proasellus karamani Remy, 1934
Proasellus lagari Henry & Magniez, 1982
Proasellus lescherae Henry & Magniez, 1978
Proasellus leysi Magniez & Henry, 2001
Proasellus ligusticus Bodon & Argano, 1982
Proasellus linearis (Birstein, 1967)
Proasellus ljovuschkini (Birstein, 1967)
Proasellus lusitanicus (Frade, 1938)
Proasellus lykaonicus Argano & Pesce, 1978
Proasellus malagensis Henry & Magniez, 2003
Proasellus maleri Henry, 1977
Proasellus margalefi Henry & Magniez, 1925
Proasellus mateusorum Afonso, 1982
Proasellus meijersae Henry & Magniez, 2003
Proasellus meridianus (Racovitza, 1919)
Proasellus micropectinatus Baratti & Messana, 1990
Proasellus minoicus Pesce & Argano, 1980
Proasellus monodi (Strouhal, 1942)
Proasellus monsferratus (Braga, 1948)
Proasellus montalentii Stoch, Valentino & Volpi, 1996
Proasellus montenigrinus (Karaman, 1934)
Proasellus navarrensis Henry & Magniez, 2003
Proasellus nolli (Karaman, 1952)
Proasellus notenboomi Henry & Magniez, 1981
Proasellus orientalis (Sket, 1965)
Proasellus ortizi Henry & Magniez, 1992
Proasellus oviedensis Henry & Magniez, 2003
Proasellus pamphylicus Henry, Magniez & Notenboom, 1996
Proasellus parvulus (Sket, 1960)
Proasellus patrizii (Arcangeli, 1952)
Proasellus pavani (Arcangeli, 1942)
Proasellus peltatus (Braga, 1944)
Proasellus phreaticus Sabater & de Manuel, 1988
Proasellus pisidicus Henry, Magniez & Notenboom, 1996
Proasellus polychaetus Dudich, 1925
Proasellus pribenicensis Flasarova, 1977
Proasellus racovitzai Henry & Magniez, 1972
Proasellus rectangulatus Afonso, 1982
Proasellus rectus Afonso, 1982
Proasellus remyi (Monod, 1932)
Proasellus rouchi Henry, 1980
Proasellus ruffoi Argano & Campanero, 2004
Proasellus similis (Birstein, 1967)
Proasellus sketi Henry, 1975
Proasellus slavus (Remy, 1948)
Proasellus slovenicus (Sket, 1957)
Proasellus solanasi Henry & Magniez, 1972
Proasellus soriensis Henry & Magniez, 2003
Proasellus spelaeus (Racovitza, 1922)
Proasellus spinipes Afonso, 1979
Proasellus stocki Henry & Magniez, 2003
Proasellus strouhali (Karaman, 1955)
Proasellus synaselloides (Henry, 1963)
Proasellus thermonyctophilus (Monod, 1924)
Proasellus valdensis (Chappuis, 1948)
Proasellus vandeli Magniez & Henry, 1969
Proasellus variegatus Afonso, 1982
Proasellus vignai Argano & Pesce, 1979
Proasellus vizcayensis Henry & Magniez, 2003
Proasellus vulgaris (Sket, 1965)
Proasellus walteri (Chappuis, 1948)
Proasellus winteri Magniez & Henry, 2001
Proasellus wolfi Dudich, 1925

References

Asellota
Taxonomy articles created by Polbot